Cawston and Marsham Heaths is a  biological Site of Special Scientific Interest north of Norwich in Norfolk.

These heaths are dominated by heather, and they have diverse flora including a rich variety of lichens. Many species of heathland birds breed on the site, including tree pipits, whinchats and nightjars.

The heaths are open to the public.

References

Sites of Special Scientific Interest in Norfolk